Consoli is a surname. Notable people with the surname include:

Carmen Consoli (born 1974), Italian singer-songwriter
Federico Consoli (born 1998), Italian rugby union player
Massimo Consoli (1945–2007), Italian gay rights activist
Robert Consoli (1964–2005), American actor and musician